Krištanci is a small settlement in the Municipality of Ljutomer in northeastern Slovenia. The area traditionally belonged to the Styria region and is now included in the Mura Statistical Region.

The local chapel is a Neo-Gothic building, built in 1904 and renovated in 1997.

References

External links
Krištanci on Geopedia

Populated places in the Municipality of Ljutomer